The Sacco is a river of central Italy, a right tributary of the Liri. It flows between the Metropolitan City of Rome Capital and the province of Frosinone in Lazio.

Territory 
The river originates from the Prenestini Mountains, formed by the confluence of two streams of the Monti Simbruini in the Apennines of Abruzzo in Lazio, and flows south-east for a total length of 87 km, crossing the Middle Latin valley between the Ernici Mountains to the northeast and the Lepini Mountains to the southwest; at the height of Ceprano it flows into the Liri River from the right.

The Sacco's main tributaries are the Cosa and the Alabro.

In old sources, it is known also the Tolero, from its ancient name Tolerus or Trerus.

Environmental issues 
The Sacco river valley is a vast territory between the provinces of Rome and Frosinone in the central-southern Italy. The intensive exploitation that for decades affected of this valley due to no-scruple companies and crooked public administration offices, produced an unprecedented environmental and social disaster.

References

Geography of Lazio
Rivers of the Province of Rome
Rivers of the Province of Frosinone
Rivers of Italy